OTM may refer to:

 Two CNBC shows:
 On the Money (2005 TV series)
 On the Money (2013 TV series)
 On the Media, a show syndicated on National Public Radio
 Operations and technology management
 Ottumwa station, Iowa, United States, Amtrak station code OTM
 Ottumwa Regional Airport, Iowa, United States, IATA code OTM
Out of the money options